Halli Reid is the first woman to swim across Lake Erie, which she accomplished in 1993 at the age of 24, swimming from Long Point, Ontario, to North East, Pennsylvania, in 17 hours.
 In acknowledgement of her accomplishment, a park in Freeport Beach, at the foot of Route 89 in North East Township in Pennsylvania, was renamed "Halli Reid Park" with a plaque designating it as such, and 9 August was designated "Halli Reid Day" by the mayor of North East, where Reid is from.

Reid was inspired to reach her goal after seeing Bob North and Harvey Snell swim across Lake Erie four years earlier, and also hoped to become the first woman to finish the swim.

References 

Living people
American long-distance swimmers
American female swimmers
Year of birth missing (living people)
21st-century American women